The 2016–17 season is the 107th season in Cádiz CF ’s history.

Squad

Competitions

Overall

Liga

League table

Copa del Rey

References

Cádiz CF seasons
Cádiz CF